The 2018 China Tour was the first season of the China Tour to carry Official World Golf Ranking points. The season consisted of 10 events, three of which were co-sanctioned by the Challenge Tour and one by the Asian Tour. The tour was organised by the China Golf Association and ran separately from the 2018 PGA Tour China.

Schedule
The following table lists official events during the 2018 season.

Order of Merit
The Order of Merit was based on prize money won during the season, calculated in Renminbi. The leading player on the tour (not otherwise exempt) earned status to play on the 2019 European Tour.

Notes

References

External links

2018 in golf
2018 in Chinese sport